The 21st Division  of the Army of the Republic of Vietnam (ARVN)—the army of the nation state of South Vietnam that existed from 1959 to 1975, was part of the IV Corps that oversaw the southernmost region of South Vietnam, the Mekong Delta. The 21st Division was based in Chương Thiện Province, the southernmost province in the whole country, in an area dominated by jungles and swamps.

History
The 21st Infantry Division was formed in 1960 from the disbanded 11th and 13th Light Divisions and their personnel and equipment assigned to the new Division; the commander and staff of the 11th Light Division became the commanding general and headquarters elements of the new unit. The old headquarters of the 13th Light Division in Tây Ninh became the rear headquarters of the Division.

The Division was responsible for the southwestern delta with an area of operations including Phong Dinh, Ba Xuyen, Bạc Lieu, An Xuyên and Chương Thiện Provinces and the southern half of Kiên Giang Province, including the province capital, Rạch Giá. Controlled by Military Region 3, four enemy regiments operated against the Division: the Viet Cong (VC) D1 Regiment in Phong Dinh and the People's Army of Vietnam (PAVN) D2, 95A Sapper and 18B Regiments in Chương Thiện.

On 24 April 1962 the Division, supported by 16 Marine helicopters from HMM-362, conducted Operation Nightingale near Cần Thơ. 591 Division troops were landed to engage a VC force killing 70 and capturing 3, while losing 3 killed. 

By the end of 1965 the US advisers to the Division regarded Division commander General Nguyễn Văn Minh highly, and they reported that the Division was "getting more aggressive" and had "a good potential not yet fully realized."

By 1967 Brig. Gen. William Robertson Desobry, the US senior adviser in IV Corps, considered the Division under General Minh the best in the ARVN and the 9th Division not far behind. However the senior US officer there, Maj. Gen. George S. Eckhardt, had recommended his dismissal, noting that he was "very temperamental and has frequently requested relief when under stress or when at odds with [the] Corps commander." Minh's close friendship with President Nguyễn Văn Thiệu brought him command of the Capital Military District in 1968.

On 5 March 1968 the Division together with Regional Forces killed 275 VC and captured 61 weapons north of Cà Mau Airfield.

At 11:00 another Division unit supported the fighting which continued until mid-afternoon when the PAVN/VC withdrew leaving 96 dead and 15 individual and six crew-served weapons and 145 Rocket-propelled grenades. An AH-1 Cobra was shot down during the battle.

In January 1970 John Paul Vann at the request of Ambassador Ellsworth Bunker produced his own evaluations of IV Corps' commanders which differed markedly from the official judgments of MACV. Vann recommended all three division commanders and the special zone commander for relief, however only the 7th Division commander was replaced.

During 1971 the Division focused on destruction of the PAVN/VC Base Area 483 in the U Minh Forest.

On 7 April 1972 at the start of the Easter Offensive the Division was alerted for movement to III Corps to support units of that Corps fighting in the Battle of An Lộc. On 10 April the first elements of this division were already deployed to Lai Khê. From 24 April the Division engaged the PAVN in a two-pronged attack to clear the road with the 32nd Regiment attacking from the north and the 33rd Regiment attacking from the south. These attacks eventually forced the 101st Regiment to withdraw west on 27 April leaving one battalion to cover the withdrawal for a further 2 days. This stalemate would continue until the PAVN withdrew from An Lộc. In mid-July the Division was replaced by the 25th Division and they completed the destruction of the remaining PAVN strongpoints by 20 July. Following the battle General Nguyễn Vĩnh Nghi was replaced as Division commander by an Airborne officer.

In June 1973 the Division, which deservedly had the worst reputation for discipline and effectiveness among the divisions in the delta, was given a new commander, Brig. Gen. Lê Văn Hưng, who had done well at An Lộc. Although General Hưng had nowhere to bring the division but up, progress was slow. He gradually replaced ineffective subordinates with combat-proven officers, many from Airborne and Ranger units, and observers noted some slight improvements in morale and combat effectiveness. General Hung employed the 15th Regiment, under his operational control from the 9th Division, exclusively in Long Mỹ District of Chương Thiện, while his three organic regiments, the 31st, 32nd and 33rd, operated throughout the rest of Chương Thiện and northern An Xuyên. The 32nd and 33rd had few
contacts with the enemy, other than receiving attacks by fire; but in late December, the 3rd Battalion, 31st Regiment was ambushed while marching to the relief of an RF outpost, and more than 100 of its men were killed. This event illustrated again longstanding defects in leadership and training in this regiment and supported the Defense Attaché Office, Saigon's year-end assessment that the Division was no more than "marginally combat effective."

In April 1975, while the PAVN 1975 Spring Offensive overran much of the country, the Division protected Binh Thuy Air Base, the Arc Road Line at outer Can Tho, the ferry crossing between Can Tho-Binh Minh, Vinh Long province and the provincial capitals at An Xuyen (Ca Mau), Chuong Thien (Hau Giang), Rạch Giá (Kiên Giang), Bạc Liêu and Ba Xuyen (Soc Trang). On the early morning of 30 April 1975, several RVNAF helicopters launched airstrikes to stop the VC from taking sections of the Arc Road Line. Later that morning President Dương Văn Minh announced the unconditional surrender to North Vietnam by radio. General Lê Văn Hưng was upset about the surrender order and proposed that ARVN unit could retreat into the delta to continue fighting. Division soldiers retreated from the Arc Line to defend central Can Tho, but Hưng changed his mind and ordered them not to defend the city because of fears of the destruction that would result. At 20:00, the VC 9th Military Region representatives demanded the surrender of all ARVN units by the morning of 1 May.  At 20:45 Hưng committed suicide at his home rather than surrender. On the morning of 1 May IV Corps commander Major General Nguyễn Khoa Nam committed suicide at his headquarters. The Division was effectively disbanded on 1 May 1975.

Organisation
Component units:
 31st Infantry Regiment
 32nd Infantry Regiment
 33rd Infantry Regiment
 210th, 211st, 212nd and 213rd Artillery Battalions
 9th Armored Cavalry Squadron
 US Advisory Team 51

References 

Divisions of South Vietnam